Prodoxus barberellus is a moth of the family Prodoxidae. It is found in south-eastern Arizona. The habitat consists of shrubby desert.

The larvae feed on Agave palmeri.

References

Moths described in 1915
Prodoxidae